Entremont is  a  archaeological site three kilometres from Aix-en-Provence at the extreme south of the Puyricard plateau. In antiquity, the oppidum at Entremont was the capital of the Celtic-Ligurian confederation of Salyes. It was settled between 180 and 170 B.C., somewhat later than the inhabitation of other oppida, such as Saint-Blaise (7th to 2nd centuries B.C.). The site was abandoned when it was taken by the Romans in 123 B.C. and replaced by Aquae Sextiae (modern Aix-en-Provence), a new Roman city founded at the foot of the plateau. By 90 B.C., the former oppidum was completely uninhabited.

The site contains two distinct areas of settlement surrounded by ramparts. Archaeologist Fernand Benoit named the older area, on the summit, "Ville Haute", and the lower "Ville Basse". Subsequently, it was recognised that the latter was an enlargement of the former, and they are now labelled "Habitat 1" and "Habitat 2", respectively.

Finds from the site are displayed at Musée Granet and include statues, bas-reliefs and impressive severed heads.

Gallery

See also
La Tène culture
Oppidum

References

Populated places established in the 2nd century BC
Populated places disestablished in the 2nd century BC
Oppida
Archaeological sites in France
Buildings and structures in Aix-en-Provence
Celtic art
Salyes